Guy Delhasse (born 19 February 1933) is a Belgian footballer. He played in seven matches for the Belgium national football team from 1961 to 1965.

References

External links
 
 

1933 births
Living people
Belgian footballers
Belgium international footballers
Place of birth missing (living people)
Association football goalkeepers
RFC Liège players
K. Beringen F.C. players